The men's +100 kilograms (heavyweight) competition at the 2006 Asian Games in Doha was held on 2 December at the Qatar SC Indoor Hall.

Schedule
All times are Arabia Standard Time (UTC+03:00)

Results

Main bracket

Repechage

References
Results

External links
Official website

M101
Judo at the Asian Games Men's Heavyweight